Sofia Befon Palaio Faliro Indoor Hall (alternate spelling: Sophia Mpefon) (Greek: Σοφία Μπεφόν Κλειστού Γυμναστηρίου), is an indoor sporting arena that is located in Palaio Faliro, Athens, Greece. The arena is named in honor of Sofia Befon. It is mainly used to host gymnastics, and basketball, volleyball, and handball games. The seating capacity of the arena is 772 people in the permanent upper tier, and 1,204 people with the retractable seats in the lower tier.

History
Sofia Befon Indoor Hall opened in 2017. It has been used as the home arena of the Greek professional basketball clubs Palaio Faliro, Panionios, and Ionikos Nikaias.

References

External links
Image 1 of Sofia Befon Indoor Hall Exterior
Image 2 of Sofia Befon Indoor Hall Exterior
Image 1 of Sofia Befon Indoor Hall Interior
Image 2 of Sofia Befon Indoor Hall Interior
Image 3 of Sofia Befon Indoor Hall Interior
Image 4 of Sofia Befon Indoor Hall Interior
Image 5 of Sofia Befon Indoor Hall Interior
Video of Sofia Befon Indoor Hall
Το κλειστό γήπεδο "Σοφία Μπεφόν" στο Π. Φάληρο θα είναι η νέα έδρα του Πανιωνίου 

Basketball venues in Greece
Handball venues in Greece
Indoor arenas in Greece
Volleyball venues in Greece